Stephanie Martin (fl. 1991–2016) is an American and Canadian singer-songwriter and actress.

Stephanie Martin or variants may also refer to:

 Stephanie Martin (composer), Canadian composer, conductor, and associate professor of music at York University
 Stefanie Martin, (1877–c. 1940), German biological anthropologist

See also
 Stéphane Martine (born 1978), French footballer